"Insomnia" is a song by British musical group Faithless. Released as the band's second single, it became one of their most successful. It was originally released in 1995 and reached number 27 on the UK Singles Chart, topping the UK Dance Chart in the process. When re-released in October 1996, the song achieved a new peak of number three in the United Kingdom and topped the charts of Finland, Norway, and Switzerland, as well as the American and Canadian dance charts. It also featured on Faithless's 1996 debut album, Reverence.

"Insomnia" was voted by Mixmag readers as the fifth greatest dance record of all time in 2013. It was certified triple platinum by the British Phonographic Industry (BPI) in 2023.

Lyrics and composition
The song features Maxi Jazz rapping from the point of view of an insomniac while he struggles to sleep ("I toss and I turn without cease, like a curse, open my eyes and rise like yeast/At least a couple of weeks since I last slept, kept takin' sleepers, but now I keep myself pepped"). The subject is resonant with fans of dance music, as stimulant use is common in club/rave culture, and insomnia is a common side effect - in a 2020 interview, Maxi Jazz acknowledged how it struck a chord with clubbers: "Suddenly the song was being played to crowds who had arguably taken 50 quid’s worth of high-powered drugs and weren’t thinking of getting much sleep for days... If I had a quid for every time someone’s come up going, 'I can’t get no sleep', I’d be living on the space station". The insomniac is also rather destitute ("Make my way to the refrigerator/One dry potato inside, no lie, not even bread, jam, when the light above my head went bam..."). According to Maxi, he spent 20 minutes writing the lyrics after being given the song's title by Rollo Armstrong, before finishing them in the studio the following evening and laying the vocal down in about 25 minutes. Although he was not an insomniac, Maxi drew on personal experience for the lyrics: he had recently suffered a painful dental abscess which had kept him awake at night. Lines about the light going out and picking up a pen in darkness were based on the prepayment electricity meter in his home, which would cut out when credit ran out, forcing him to write by candlelight.

According to Sister Bliss, the track's music was written in bandmate Rollo's recording studio, located in a garden shed: she came up with the song's title as she was unable to sleep, describing the experience of working in the studio during the day and DJing at night as being "like having permanent jetlag". She has stated that the song's reggae-inflected bassline was influenced by Lionrock, whilst placing the main keyboard riff towards the end of the song "was an idea we got from Underworld’s way of building tension: just waiting, waiting, waiting then – bang!". Sister Bliss wrote the riff after Rollo asked her to "do big strings", borrowing the idea of shifting from a major chord to a minor chord from Donna Summer's "I Feel Love".

Release
The album version is nearly nine minutes long and contains some lyrics not able to be broadcast on the radio edit due to their explicit content. Maxi Jazz changed the opening line from "I only smoke weed when I need to" to "Deep in the bosom of the gentle night" due to pressure from MTV. It also contains some bells chiming at the start of the song (sampled from a BBC Sound Archive disc) not generally known by the club-going public as many people know the Monster Mix or the Monster Mix Radio Edit. The beginning of the album version of the song also features a sample from Biosphere's "Novelty Waves" (1994). The Monster Mix was the mix featured on Faithless' greatest hits album Forever Faithless, with the original edit being the work of Radio Victory's Bill Padley. This edit was picked up by BBC Radio 1 and became a small UK Top 40 hit, with the Cheeky label's recording being licensed through Champion Records at the time. After the song gained popularity in continental Europe, Pete Tong campaigned for a re-release: Cheeky/Champion chose to hold back the re-issue so it arrived in shops on the same day as the Spice Girls' "Say You'll Be There", so it would be placed in racks alongside it. The song went on to top the U.S. Hot Dance Club Play chart. The Moody Mix featured on some of the singles was also on the Reverence / Irreverence release.

Critical reception
Justin Chadwick from Albumism described the song as a "frenetic yet melodic ode to late night restlessness and sleep-deprived reveries", adding it as "phenomenal". Larry Flick from Billboard wrote, "This single serves as a fine peek into the project, giving listeners a taste of urgent dance rhythms, a complex and infectious pop melody, and vocals that are notches above the typical vamps heard on club-originated records." Complex said that Faithless' "Insomnia" "spoke to a number of ravers out there who lived for the night/weekend and, sadly, the drugs that kept them partying to the break of dawn (and beyond). Insomnia was and is real for the raver massive, and Faithless brought those vibes to song perfectly." Gerry Kiernan commented on the song in the 2010 book 1001 Songs You Must Hear Before You Die, "Unleashed in an era of uplifting "handbag" house", "Insomnia" crept with nocturnal stealth through rave culture into suburban bedrooms. As its title suggested, this climatic, hands-in-the-air dance anthem was not one to put on before bedtime." Tim Jeffery from Music Weeks RM Dance Update rated it four out of five, writing, "Following very much in the style of its predecessor with all the Rollo production hallmarks including the piercing organ and synth riffs and a bouncy bassline. As with the debut, there's also the half speed secion in the middle to incorporate the rap and vocals which aren't as instant as 'Salva Mea' but grow on you. With the formula now established, this one may fare better commercially." Ben Turner from Muzik noted that "it has soul, grace, emotion and a distinctly dark, melancholic side. Happy house has never been challenged in this way."

Chart performance
"Insomnia" was very successful on the charts on several continents, becoming one of the group's biggest hits to date. In Europe, it reached number-one in Finland, Norway and Switzerland. Additionally, it managed to climb into the Top 10 also in Austria, Belgium (number 2), Denmark, France, Germany (number 2), Iceland, Ireland, Scotland, Sweden and the United Kingdom, as well as on the Eurochart Hot 100, where it hit number 3. In the UK, "Insomnia" also peaked at number 3 in its second run on the UK Singles Chart, on 20 October 1996. But on the UK Dance Chart, it was a even bigger hit, peaking at number-one. Outside Europe, the single reached the top spot on the RPM Dance Chart in Canada and the Billboard Dance Club Songs in the United States. On the Billboard Hot 100, it went to number 62. In Oceania, it reached number 16 in Australia and number 39 in New Zealand. The song earned a gold record in Australia, Belgium, France and Switzerland, a platinum record in Germany and Norway, and a triple platinum record in the UK, with sales and streams of 1,800,000 units. After Maxi Jazz's December 2022 death, "Insomnia" charted at number four on the UK Singles Downloads Chart.

Music video
A music video was made to accompany the song. It was directed by British director Lindy Heymann and partially set on the Aylesbury Estate in south London. The video was uploaded to YouTube in July 2015, and as of June 2022, it has got more than 100 million views.

Impact and legacy
DJ Magazine ranked it number 14 in their list of "Top 100 Club Tunes" in 1998.

MTV Dance placed "Insomnia" at number 22 in their list of "The 100 Biggest 90's Dance Anthems Of All Time" in November 2011.

It was voted by Mixmag readers as the fifth "Greatest Dance Record of All Time" in 2013.

Track listing1995 UK release and 1996 UK CD 1 "Insomnia" (Monster Radio Edit) – 3:34
 "Insomnia" (Original Radio Edit) – 3:36
 "Insomnia" (Monster Mix) – 8:38
 "Insomnia" (Moody Mix) – 10:40
 "Insomnia" (Tuff Mix) – 7:181995 European release "Insomnia" (CEC Edit) – 4:37
 "Insomnia" (Monster Radio Edit) – 3:33
 "Insomnia" (Original Mix) – 10:55
 "Insomnia" (Monster Mix) – 8:38
 "Insomnia" (Moody Mix) – 10:42
 "Insomnia" (Tuff Mix) – 7:191996 Scandinavian release "Insomnia" (Monster Radio Edit) – 3:36
 "Insomnia" (Original Radio Edit) – 3:38
 "Insomnia" (Monster Mix) – 8:41
 "Insomnia" (Moody Mix) – 10:45
 "Insomnia" (Tuff Mix) – 7:181996 Italian release "Insomnia" (Monster Radio Edit) – 3:34
 "Insomnia" (Original Radio Edit) – 3:36
 "Insomnia" (Monster Mix) – 8:38
 "Insomnia" (Moody Mix) – 10:40
 "Insomnia" (Tuff Mix) – 7:181996 UK CD 2 "Insomnia" (CEC Radio Mix) – 3:53
 "Insomnia" (96 Remix) – 7:16
 "Insomnia" (DJ Quicksilver Mix) – 7:58
 "Insomnia" (De Donatis Mix) – 7:381996 European release "Insomnia" (CEC Radio Mix) – 3:53
 "Insomnia" (Original Radio Edit) – 3:37
 "Insomnia" (96 Remix) – 7:16
 "Insomnia" (DJ Quicksilver Mix) – 7:58
 "Insomnia" (De Donatis Mix) – 7:38
 "Insomnia" (Monster Mix) – 8:351997 US release 1 "Insomnia" (Monster Mix Radio Edit) – 3:33
 "Insomnia" (Armand's European Vacation Mix) – 7:56
 "Insomnia" (Monster Mix) – 8:34
 "Insomnia" (Armand's Mission to Mars Mix) – 8:49
 "Insomnia" (De Donatis Mix) – 7:35
 "Insomnia" (CEC Radio Mix) – 3:511997 US release 2 "Insomnia" (Monster Mix Radio Edit) – 3:33
 "Insomnia" (Album Version) – 8:43
 "Insomnia" (De Donatis Mix) – 7:23
 "Reverence" (Tamsin's Drum & Bass Mix) – 5:20
 "Don't Leave" (Floating Bass Mix) – 5:53
*The 1997 US releases used the 1995 UK release cover

Charts

Weekly charts

Year-end charts

Certifications

Release history

2005 mix
"Insomnia" was re-mixed and re-released in 2005 after the re-entry of the 1996 single into the UK Singles Chart at number 48. This was partly because of Faithless releasing their greatest hits album. The re-mix was not used on the greatest hits with the Monster Mix being the version which featured on the album. The re-mixed version reached number 17 on the UK Singles Chart.

CD1
 "Insomnia" (Blissy vs. Armand Van Helden 2005 Re-Work) – 03:22
 "Insomnia" (Monster Mix Radio Edit) – 03:36

CD2
 "Insomnia" (Blissy vs. Armand Van Helden 2005 Re-Work) – 03:22
 "Insomnia" (Sasha B.A Remix) – 09:52
 "Insomnia" (Armand's European Vacation Mix) – 08:03
 "Insomnia" (Monster Mix) – 08:35

Version 2.0 by Avicii
In 2015, Swedish DJ and record producer Avicii released a remix titled "Insomnia 2.0 (Avicii Remix)". The track was released on 24 July 2015 and reached the German charts. It was also featured on the Faithless 2.0 release in Avicii extended remix and Avicii radio exit remix formats (as well as the 1995 Monster Mix). "Insomnia 2.0" also went to number one on the US Dance chart.

Mike Candys and Jack Holiday version

In 2009, Swiss DJs Mike Candys and Jack Holiday recorded a remix of the song. It was released in September 2009 as their debut single and charted throughout Europe.

Track listingCD maxi – Europe (2009)'
 "Insomnia" (Radio Edit) – 3:31
 "Insomnia" (Chris Crime Infinity Remix) – 4:41
 "Insomnia" (Christopher S. Remix) – 4:39

Chart performance

Maceo Plex version
In 2021, Cuban-American DJ Maceo Plex released a remix of the song.

See also
 List of number-one dance singles of 2015 (U.S.)

References

1995 singles
1995 songs
1996 singles
1997 singles
2005 singles
Arista Records singles
Cheeky Records singles
Faithless songs
House music songs
Music videos directed by Lindy Heymann
Number-one singles in Finland
Number-one singles in Norway
Number-one singles in Switzerland
Sleep disorders in fiction
Songs written by Maxi Jazz
Songs written by Rollo Armstrong
Songs written by Sister Bliss
Insomnia